The 2014–15 Loyola Greyhounds men's basketball team represented Loyola University Maryland during the 2014–15 NCAA Division I men's basketball season. The Greyhounds, led by second year head coach G.G. Smith, played their home games at Reitz Arena and were members of the Patriot League. They finished the season 11–19, 7–11 in Patriot League play to finish in ninth place. They lost in the first round of the Patriot League tournament to Holy Cross.

Roster

Schedule

|-
!colspan=9 style="background:#00563F; color:#DBD9D1;"| Exhibition

|-
!colspan=9 style="background:#00563F; color:#DBD9D1;"| Non-conference regular season

|-
!colspan=9 style="background:#00563F; color:#DBD9D1;"| Conference regular season

|-
!colspan=9 style="background:#00563F; color:#DBD9D1;"| Patriot League tournament

References

Loyola Greyhounds men's basketball seasons
Loyola